Oyigbo is a town, 30 kilometers from the port city of Port Harcourt and a local government area of Rivers State, Nigeria.

Sir Precious Oforji was elected Chairman of the Oyigbo LGA in 2008. EZE Mike Nwaji was enthroned as the crowned traditional king of Obigbo in 1998. The towns and villages in Oyigbo Local Government area include : Oyigbo district; Asa, Komkom, Obeama, Oyigbo, while for the Ndoki district they include Afa Uku, Afam, Afam Nta, Azusogu, Egberu, Mgboji, Mrihu, Obeakpu, Obeta, Obumku,Okoloma, Okponta, Umuagbai, Umuosi.

Oil and gas exploration
Shell Petroleum Development Company (SPDC) operates an oil well in the LGA. Eastern Network Gas Pipeline (Alscon pipeline) passes through Oyigbo in the north. Nigerian National Petroleum Corporation, NNPC and the Rivers State Government under Gov. Rotimi Chibuike Amaechi pledged to work together to restore production activities at the Shell Petroleum Development Company, SPDC operated Oyigbo Gas Plant. On November 1, 2013, citing considerable health and safety risk to people, Shell Petroleum Development Company of Nigeria Ltd (SPDC), JV shut down Oyigbo gas plant over encroachment on the right-of-way of gas pipelines.

On June 28, 2015, SPDC JV's announced that its Afam VI located in Okoloma village of Oyigbo had delivered 20 million MWh of electricity into the national grid and created over 150 jobs.

References

Geography of Port Harcourt
Local Government Areas in Rivers State
1991 establishments in Nigeria